is a Japanese actor. He was born in Kobe, Hyogo Prefecture, and is of one-quarter Chinese descent and speaks fluent Chinese. In 2009, he was selected from about 30,000 applicants as the winner of the Nationwide Amuse Audition.

Career

Filmography

Films
 Drucker in the Dug-Out (2011), Harumichi Tamura
 The Detective Is in the Bar (2011)
 Tengoku Kara no Yell (2011), Kiyoshi Nakamura
 Soup: Umarekawari no Monogatari (2012), Naoyuki Mikami
 Enoshima Prism (2013), Saku Kijima
 Daily Lives of High School Boys (2013), Yoshitake
 Puzzle (2014), Shigeo Yuasa
 Kujira no Ita Natsu (2014), Chūya
 Hibi Rock (2014), Takurō Hibinuma
 Flying Colors (2015), Reiji Mori
 The Pearls of the Stone Man (2015)
 Lychee Light Club (2015)
 Chihayafuru Part 1 (2016), Taichi Mashima
 Chihayafuru Part 2 (2016), Taichi Mashima
 Moriyamachu Driving School (2016), Kiyotaka Satō
 Museum (2016), Junichi Nishino
 Sagrada Reset: Part 1 (2017), Kei Asai
 Sagrada Reset: Part 2 (2017), Kei Asai
 Teiichi: Battle of Supreme High (2017), Kikuma Tōgō
 Chigasaki Monogatari: My Little Hometown (2017), Keisuke Kuwata
 Love × Doc (2018), Seiya Hanada
 Chihayafuru Part 3 (2018), Taichi Mashima
 The Antique (2018), Daisuke Goura
 Junpei, Think Again (2018), Junpei Sakamoto
 Walking Man (2019), Atom Samaki
 Alivehoon (2022), Kōichi Ōba
 And So I'm at a Loss (2023), Katō

Television
 Peacemaker Kurogane (MBS, 2010), Rei kitamura
 Pro Golfer Hana (YTV, 2010), Riku Nomiya
 Tenshi no Wakemae (NHK, 2010), Kōta Kitamura
 Hammer Session! (TBS, 2010), Ken Ebihara
 Tōi Hi no Yukue (WOWOW, 2011), Takashi Kanda
 High School Restaurant (NTV, 2011), Kōichi Nakamura
 Taira no Kiyomori Episode 6 (NHK, Taiga Drama, 2012), Shunya
 Blackboard: Jidai to Tatakatta Kyōshitachi (TBS, 2012), Hiromasa Isobe
 Umechan Sensei (NHK, 2012), Mitsuo Satō
 Umechan Sensei: Kekkon Dekinai Otoko to Onna Special (NHK BS Premium, 2012)
 Miss Double Faced Teacher Episode 7 (TBS, 2012), Naoki Īzuka
 GTO Episode 10-11 (KTV, 2012), Shō Shibutani
 Perfect Blue Episode 9-11 (TBS, 2012), Katsuhiko Morooka
 Sodom no Ringo: Lot o Koroshita Musumetachi (WOWOW, 2013), Toshiya Shimomura(Childhood)
 35-sai no Koukousei (NTV, 2013), Osamu Yukawa
 The Detective's Gaze Episode 1 (TBS, 2013), Yūma Maeda
 The Hours of My Life (Fuji TV, 2014), Rikuto Sawada
 All About My Siblings (Fuji TV, 2014)
 Koinaka (Fuji TV, 2015), Shōta Aoi
 Fragile (Fuji TV, 2016), Hisashi Morii
 A Girl & Three Sweethearts (Fuji TV, 2016), Toma Shibasaki
 Rappers of Saitama Drama Episode 5–8 (TV Tokyo, 2017),
 The Supporting Actors (TV Tokyo, 2017) Himself 
 Teiichi's Country - Cafe at Student Street (Fuji TV, 2017), Kikuma Togo
 Doctor-X (S5) Episode 1–2 (TV Asahi, 2017), Ryoji Ito Denei Shojo: Video Girl Ai 2018 (TV Tokyo, 2018), Sho Moteuchi
 Choosing Spouse By Lottery (Fuji TV, 2018), Tatsuhiko Miyasaka
 Endo Kenichi to Kudo Kankuro no Benkyo Sasete Itadakimasu Episode 4 (WOWOW, 2018)
 Secret Unrequited Love (TV Asahi, 2019), Takuma Kakinouchi
 MAGI Tensho Keno Shonen Shisetsu (Amazon Prime Video, 2019), Itō Mancio
 Diver: Special Investigation Unit (Fuji TV, KTV, 2020), Syo Sanemura
 Don't Cry Doctor-In-Training (TV Asahi, 2021), So Kawamura

 Dubbing 
 Typhoon Noruda (2015), Shūichi Azuma

Bibliography

Photobooks
 Nomura Shuhei in Kinema (Amuse, Inc., June 2015) 

Awards
 The 10th Ōsaka Cinema Festival (2015): Best Newcomer for Kujira no Ita Natsu and Hibi Rock The 7th Tama Cinema Forum: Best Rising Actor for Ai o Tsumu Hito, Hibi Rock, Flying Colors and Typhoon Noruda''

References

External links
  
 

1993 births
Living people
Actors from Kobe
Japanese male film actors
Japanese male television actors
Japanese people of Chinese descent
Amuse Inc. talents
21st-century Japanese male actors
21st-century Japanese singers
21st-century Japanese male singers
Horikoshi High School alumni